The Sixth Election Committee of the Hong Kong Special Administrative Region was elected in the 2021 Election Committee subsector elections. It serves from 22 October 2021 to 21 October 2026 and is responsible for electing the Chief Executive of Hong Kong in the 2022 election and 40 members of the Legislative Council in the 2021 election and the 2025 election.

Italicised members indicate overlapped membership in different subsectors. Crossed out individuals in ex-officio subsectors indicate their memberships were lost due to various reasons. Brackets after members show the party affiliation of that member and/or the overlapping subsector membership.

The tag  behind each member indicates the candidate nominates John Lee in the 2022 election.

First Sector

Catering

Commercial (First)

Commercial (Second)

Commercial (Third)

Employers' Federation of Hong Kong

Finance

Financial Services

Hotel

Import and Export

Industrial (First)

Industrial (Second)

Insurance

Real Estate and Construction

Small and Medium Enterprises

Textiles and Garment

Tourism

Transport

Wholesale and Retail

Second Sector

Accountancy
Elected:

Nominated by Association of Hong Kong Accounting Advisors Limited:

Architectural, Surveying, Planning and Landscape
Elected:

Ex-officio:

Chinese Medicine
Elected:

Nominated by WFCMS (Hong Kong) Council Members Association Limited:

Education
Elected:

Ex-officio:

Engineering
Elected:

Ex-officio:

Legal
Elected:

Ex-officio:

Nominated by China Law Society’s HK Council Members Association:

Medical and Health Services
Elected:

Ex-officio:

Social Welfare
Elected:

Ex-officio:

Sports, Performing Arts, Culture and Publication
Elected:

Nominated by Sports Federation & Olympic Committee of Hong Kong, China:

Nominated by China Federation of Literary and Art Circles Hong Kong Member Association Limited:

Nominated by Hong Kong Publishing Federation Limited:

Technology and Innovation
Elected:

Nominated by The Greater Bay Area Association of Academicians:

Third Sector

Agriculture and Fisheries

Associations of Chinese Fellow Townsmen

Grassroots Associations

Labour

Religious
Nominated by Catholic Diocese of Hong Kong:

Nominated by Chinese Muslim Cultural and Fraternal Association:

Nominated by Hong Kong Christian Council:

Nominated by the Hong Kong Taoist Association:

Nominated by the Confucian Academy:

Nominated by the Hong Kong Buddhist Association:

Fourth Sector

Members of the Legislative Council (ex officio)
6th Legislative Council (until 31 December 2021)

7th Legislative Council (since 1 January 2022)

Heung Yee Kuk

Representatives of Associations of Hong Kong Residents in the Mainland

Representatives of Members of Area Committees, District Fight Crime Committees, and District Fire Safety Committees of Hong Kong and Kowloon

Representatives of Members of Area Committees, District Fight Crime Committees, and District Fire Safety Committees of the New Territories

Fifth Sector

HKSAR Deputies to the NPC and HKSAR Members of the National Committee of the CPPCC (ex officio)
13th National People's Congress and Chinese People's Political Consultative Conference (until 2022):

Representatives of Hong Kong Members of Relevant National Organisations

See also
 List of members of the Election Committee of Hong Kong, 2017–21

References

2021 Hong Kong legislative election
2022 Hong Kong Chief Executive election